Igor Medved (born 9 March 1981) is a Slovenian former ski jumper who competed from 2001 to 2003. At World Cup level he scored three top-10 individual finishes, with the best being third in Trondheim on 9 March 2001. He also scored five top-10 finishes in team competitions, with the highest being second in Lahti on 2 March 2002.

References

1981 births
Living people
Slovenian male ski jumpers
Skiers from Ljubljana
21st-century Slovenian people